The E-Z-Go 200 was a NASCAR Craftsman Truck Series race that took place at Atlanta Motor Speedway. AMS obtained a fall race when Darlington Raceway lost its truck race as a byproduct of the Ferko lawsuit, when NASCAR was forced to relinquish Darlington's Southern 500 tripleheader to Texas Motor Speedway. However, since Texas was already running a second Truck Series race, the race was awarded to sister track Atlanta giving them two Truck Series races. This race was replaced by a Truck Series race at Chicagoland Speedway in 2009.

Past winners

Multiple winners (drivers)

Multiple winners (teams)

Manufacturer wins

References

External links
 

NASCAR Truck Series races
Former NASCAR races